Jorge Cordova (born September 25, 1981) is a former American football linebacker. Cordova, who is of Mexican–American descent, was drafted by the Jacksonville Jaguars in the third round of the 2004 NFL Draft. He attended Murrieta Valley High School  in Murrieta, California and graduated class of 1999. He played college football at Nevada.

Early life
Cordova was born on September 25, 1981 to Jorge Cordova Sr., Alicia Brent and Wade Brent. He was a football standout at Murrieta Valley High School.

College career
Cordova was an impressive defensive prospect from the University of Nevada, totaling 311 tackles with 29.5 sacks, 44 stops for losses, 10 quarterback pressures, five fumble recoveries, eight forced fumbles, seven pass deflections and two blocked kicks in 42 games. He led the Western Athletic Conference (WAC) with nine sacks as a junior. As a senior, he recorded 16 tackles, five sacks, forced a fumble and blocked a field goal in a game against Washington, earning WAC Defensive Player of the Week honors.

Professional career

Jacksonville Jaguars
Cordova was drafted in the 2004 NFL Draft by the Jaguars, but tore his ACL during training camp and was placed on injured reserve.  In 2005, he showed great promise during the preseason with five tackles, but aggravated his injury and was again placed on injured reserve.

In the 2006 season, Cordova finally made his first career NFL start.  Halfway through the game, he was moved from the linebacker position to defensive end to replace the injured Reggie Hayward.

Miami Dolphins
On August 28, 2007 the Jaguars released him and he signed with the Dolphins.

References

External links
Tennessee Titans bio

1981 births
Living people
American football linebackers
Nevada Wolf Pack football players
Jacksonville Jaguars players
Miami Dolphins players
Tennessee Titans players
People from Murrieta, California
Players of American football from San Diego
American sportspeople of Mexican descent
Ed Block Courage Award recipients